Md Obayed Ullah Al Masud is a Bangladeshi banker who was the Managing Director of Sonali Bank and Rupali Bank. He is a director of Padma Bank.

Early life and education 
Masud completed his Bachelors and Masters in Commerce from the University of Dhaka in 1982. He completed an MBA from the Institute of Business Administration, University of Dhaka in 1988.

Career 
Masud joined Agrani Bank in 1983 as a senior officer.

In 2011, Murad became the Deputy Managing Director of Agrani Bank. He then worked as the Managing Director of Karmasangsthan Bank.

From 24 August 2016 to 24 August 2019, Murad was the Managing Director of Sonali Bank. During his term he worked on recovering defaulted loans. He also introduced low interest housing loans for government officers.

In January 2017, Murad was elected an executive member of Bangladesh Foreign Exchange Dealers’ Association. On 21 August 2019, he was appointed Managing Director of Rupali Bank and Ataur Rahman Prodhan replaced him as the Managing Director of Sonali Bank. He retired from Rupali Bank on 27th August 2022.

Murad represents Rupali Bank at the Metropolitan Chamber of Commerce and Industry. During his tenure, Rupali Bank received criticism for a very generous rescheduling plan for loan defaulter Mother Textile.

Personal life 
Masud's brother, Hedayetullah Al Mamun, is the chairman of Janata Bank, a state-owned bank.

References 

Living people
Year of birth missing (living people)
Bangladeshi bankers
University of Dhaka alumni